Payen may refer to:

People
 Anselme Payen (1795–1878), French chemist
 Antoine Payen the Younger (1792–1853), Belgian painter, naturalist and collector
 Antoine Payen the Elder (1748–1798), Belgian architect
 Antoine Payen (animator) (1902–1985), French animator
 Louis Payen (real name Albert Liénard, 1875–1927), French librettist
 Nicolas Payen (also Nicolas Colin, c. 1512–1559), Franco-Flemish composer and choirmaster
 Nicolas Roland Payen (1914–2004), French aeronautical engineer, including a list of 'Payen' aircraft
 Pierre Payen (1914–2004), French editorial cartoonist and caricaturist
 Payen Talu (born 1951), Taiwanese politician

Other uses
 Payén (also known as Reserva Provincial La Payunia), a natural reserve in Argentina

See also 
 Hugues de Payens (c. 1070–1136), co-founder and first Grand Master of the Knights Templar
 Pascal Payen-Appenzeller (born 1944), Franco-Swiss historian, poet and writer